Rex Houston Mays Jr. (March 10, 1913 – November 6, 1949) was a AAA Championship Car race driver. He was a two-time AAA champion and won 8 points-scoring races.

He made his Indianapolis 500 debut in 1934 and won the pole in 1935, 1936, and again in 1940 and finished second, he returned the next year and finished second again. Mays won the AAA National Championship in 1940 and 1941. However, World War II suspended racing until 1946, denying Mays of what likely would have been the peak of his career. After the war, Mays again won the Indy pole in 1948 but was knocked out by a mechanical problem.

He was killed at the age of 36 in a crash during the only Champ Car race held at Del Mar Fairgrounds race track in Del Mar, California in November 1949. In this accident, Mays swerved to miss a car that had crashed in front of him. His car went out of control and flipped, throwing Mays to the track surface, where  he was hit by a trailing car.

In a race at Milwaukee, a fellow driver, Duke Dinsmore,  was thrown from his car during an incident in the south turn. Rex Mays was leading the race and saw Dinsmore's body lying in the middle of the south turn. Rex spun his car into the wall, got out of the car, and pulled the unconscious Duke Dinsmore to safety. Because of his selfless heroic action, the June race at the Milwaukee Mile was named the "Rex Mays Classic"  (from 1950 to 1987).

In addition, the road racing course just outside his hometown of Riverside held, from 1967 to 1969, a 300-mile Indianapolis-car event called the Rex Mays 300.

Career awards
He was inducted into the Motorsports Hall of Fame of America in 1995.
Mays was inducted in the National Sprint Car Hall of Fame in the first class in 1990.

Complete AAA Championship Car results

Indianapolis 500 results

References

External links
 Rex Mays at The Greatest 33
 Rex Mays at Champ Car Stats
 Indy's unluckiest legends: Part 1  - Racer, Robin Miller, 20 May 2013

1913 births
1949 deaths
AAA Championship Car drivers
Champ Car champions
Indianapolis 500 drivers
Indianapolis 500 polesitters
National Sprint Car Hall of Fame inductees
Sportspeople from Riverside, California
Racing drivers from California
Racing drivers who died while racing
Sports deaths in California